Dariusz Trela (born 5 December 1989) is a Polish footballer who plays as a goalkeeper.

References

External links 

 

1989 births
Living people
Footballers from Kraków
Polish footballers
Association football goalkeepers
Bruk-Bet Termalica Nieciecza players
Wisła Kraków players
Okocimski KS Brzesko players
Ekstraklasa players
Piast Gliwice players
Lechia Gdańsk players
GKS Bełchatów players
Korona Kielce players